Stanislav Leontiev is a Russian operatic tenor who was born in Leningrad. He graduated from the Glinka Choral School of the Academic Capella and Rimsky-Korsakov Conservatory in 1995 and 2000 respectively. Prior to joining with Mariinsky Theatre in 2010, he used to be the Zazerkalie Theatre soloist.

Mariinsky Theatre repertoire
Khovanshchina — Minion
Boris Godunov — Misail
Eugene Onegin — Monsieur Trique
Semyon Kotko — Mikola
Dead Souls — Seliphan
Il barbiere di Siviglia — Almaviva
The Marriage of Figaro — Don Bazilio
Aida — Messenger
Rigoletto — Duke of Mantua
Macbeth — Malcolm
Oedipus Rex — Shepherd
Les Troyens — Iopas
A Midsummer Night's Dream — Flute
The Makropulos Affair — Count Hauk-Šendorf
La vida breve — 1st and 2nd voices of Salesman

References

Living people
1970s births
Russian tenors
Musicians from Saint Petersburg
21st-century Russian singers
21st-century Russian male singers